Jacqui Burke (born 22 May 1953) is an Australian politician and was a member of the Australian Capital Territory Legislative Assembly representing the electorate of Molonglo for the Liberal Party.

Legislative career
She was sworn into the ACT Legislative Assembly on 13 February 2001 to fill a casual vacancy created following the resignation of Kate Carnell. Burke later contested the 2001 election, but was unsuccessful.

Following the resignation of Gary Humphries, Burke was again sworn into the ACT Legislative Assembly on 18 February 2003. She successfully contested the 2004 ACT general election. She was later voted out of office in the 2008 ACT general election.

References

Liberal Party of Australia members of the Australian Capital Territory Legislative Assembly
Members of the Australian Capital Territory Legislative Assembly
1953 births
Living people
21st-century Australian politicians
21st-century Australian women politicians
Women members of the Australian Capital Territory Legislative Assembly